Alfred Rudolph Cole (born April 21, 1964), best known as Al Cole, is an American former professional boxer. He won the IBF cruiserweight title and was a major force in the division until moving up to heavyweight, where he had less success. In 2001, Cole portrayed boxer Ernie Terrell in the film Ali.

Career
Cole, at 6'4", was a large and dominant cruiserweight boxer. Later in his career, he did not have the size or power to compete at the upper echelon of the heavyweight division when he moved up in weight class. He listed his hometown as Spring Valley, New York.
Cole began his career on a 20-1 tear and captured the cruiserweight title by defeating IBF champ James Warring after only three years as a professional.  Cole went on to defend the title five times. His most notable defenses came against Uriah Grant (a fighter who beat Thomas Hearns). Cole defeated Grant twice by unanimous decision.
Throughout his career Al Cole has appeared in movies with several big actors such as Robert De Niro, Will Smith, John Voight, Jamie Foxx, Jeffrey Wright & Catherine Zeta-Jones. In one of the movies Al Cole appeared in, Ali, people got knocked out during the audition. Cole was cited -"People really got knocked out auditioning for the movie roles".

Heavyweight
Cole went up to heavyweight without losing his title. In his first heavyweight fight, Cole was nearly swept on all cards by Tim Witherspoon in a unanimous decision loss.
A year later, Cole was TKO'd by Michael Grant in the 10th round.  Cole then had brief success by drawing over ten rounds with up and coming, undefeated prospect Kirk Johnson.  Johnson was to win the rematch via unanimous decision, a loss which began Cole's career downfall.
Cole went on to lose to Corrie Sanders and Jameel McCline.  Cole's career then had a brief resurgence with a victory over undefeated Vincent Maddalone, a unanimous decision over David Izonritei, and a draw with Jeremy Williams).  Cole failed to build on the momentum though, dropping decisions to Lance Whitaker, former heavyweight champion Hasim Rahman, and finally a TKO loss to Sultan Ibragimov.  Cole then retired, but returned to defeat heavyweight prospect Joey "Minnesota Ice" Abell on September 5 in Sweden. A year later, he was defeated by fringe contender Timur Ibragimov. Cole had scheduled to fight a rematch with Abell in  2010 in Uganda, but that bout fell through. Reflecting on his long career in boxing, Cole noted "I gave people what they wanted to see-an action-packed fight."

Life as a trainer
Cole is now a professional boxing trainer. He is currently training USBA Heavyweight Champion Maurice Harris for Boxing 360.

Professional boxing record

See also
List of world cruiserweight boxing champions

References

External links

|- 

1964 births
Living people
American male boxers
African-American boxers
Boxers from New Jersey
Boxers from New York (state)
People from Spring Valley, New York
Cruiserweight boxers
Heavyweight boxers
World cruiserweight boxing champions
International Boxing Federation champions